Corinne Erhel (3 February 1967 – 5 May 2017) was a French politician who served as a member of the National Assembly from 2007 to 2017, representing the Côtes-d'Armor department.

Early life
Corinne Erhel was born on 3 February 1967 in Quimper, Finistère. She graduated from the institute of advanced studies of rural law and agricultural economics (IHEDREA).

Career
Erhel joined the Socialist Party. In 1997, she became assistant parliamentarian for Alain Gouriou, deputy mayor of Lannion. In 2004 she was elected regional advisor for Brittany.

Erhel served as a member of the National Assembly from 2007 to 2017.

Death
On 5 May 2017, Erhel died after collapsing while she was giving a speech at a meeting in support of Emmanuel Macron for the 2017 French presidential election.

References

External links

1967 births
2017 deaths
Politicians from Quimper
Socialist Party (France) politicians
21st-century French women politicians
Women members of the National Assembly (France)
Deputies of the 13th National Assembly of the French Fifth Republic
Deputies of the 14th National Assembly of the French Fifth Republic
La République En Marche! politicians